Fabrício Manini (born October 8, 1980 in Água Boa, Mato Grosso) is a Brazilian footballer who plays central back. He currently plays for Paracatu Futebol Clube.

Career
Played for Ceará from summer 2008 to the early 2012.

Hate against poor
In 2022, the player showed anger at the result of Brazil's presidential elections and asked people to "run over the poor" who did not vote for the candidate he supports, Bolsonaro.

Contract
 Ceará.

References

External links
zerozerofootball.com

1980 births
Living people
Brazilian footballers
Campeonato Brasileiro Série A players
Mogi Mirim Esporte Clube players
Associação Atlética Anapolina players
Sociedade Esportiva do Gama players
América Futebol Clube (RN) players
Ceará Sporting Club players
Oeste Futebol Clube players
Fortaleza Esporte Clube players
Association football central defenders